MIPS, formerly MIPS Computer Systems, Inc. and MIPS Technologies, Inc., is an American fabless semiconductor design company that is most widely known for developing the MIPS architecture and a series of RISC CPU chips based on it. MIPS provides processor architectures and cores for digital home, networking, embedded, Internet of things and mobile applications.

MIPS was founded in 1984 to commercialize the work being carried out at Stanford University on the MIPS architecture, a pioneering RISC design. The company generated intense interest in the late 1980s, seeing design wins with Digital Equipment Corporation (DEC) and Silicon Graphics (SGI), among others. By the early 1990s the market was crowded with new RISC designs and further design wins were limited. The company was purchased by SGI in 1992, by that time its only major customer, and won several new designs in the game console space. In 1998, SGI announced they would be transitioning off MIPS and spun off the company.

After several years operating as an independent design house, in 2013 the company was purchased by Imagination Technologies, best known for their PowerVR graphics processor family. They were sold to Tallwood Venture Capital in 2017 and then purchased soon after by Wave Computing in 2018. Wave declared bankruptcy in 2020, emerging in 2021 as MIPS and announcing that the MIPS architecture was being abandoned in favor of RISC-V designs.

History 

MIPS Computer Systems Inc. was founded in 1984 by a group of researchers from Stanford University that included John L. Hennessy and Chris Rowen. These researchers had worked on a project called MIPS (for Microprocessor without Interlocked Pipeline Stages), one of the projects that pioneered the RISC concept. Other principal founders were Skip Stritter, formerly a Motorola technologist, and John Moussouris, formerly of IBM.

The initial CEO was Vaemond Crane, formerly President and CEO of Computer Consoles Inc., who arrived in February 1985 and departed in June 1989. He was replaced by Bob Miller, a former senior IBM and Data General executive. Miller ran the company through its IPO and subsequent sale to Silicon Graphics.

In 1986, MIPS Computer Systems designs were noticed by companies such as Cadnetix, Prime Computer and Silicon Graphics (SGI), these adopting the R2000 for new products, with SGI adopting the MIPS architecture for its computers having noted that the Motorola 68000 series of processors was "at the end of its price-performance curve". Identifying the "time-to-market issues" of companies introducing workstation products, MIPS introduced a range of component kits, processor boards and memory boards, intended as "building blocks" for such companies to build into systems. Additionally, development systems such as the M/500 were sold, intended to support software development at systems vendors building MIPS-based hardware products. In December 1989, MIPS held its first IPO. That year, Digital Equipment Corporation (DEC) released a Unix workstation based on the MIPS design.

After developing the R2000 and R3000 microprocessors, a management change brought along the larger dreams of being a computer vendor. The company found itself unable to compete in the computer market against much larger companies and was struggling to support the costs of developing both the chips and the systems (MIPS Magnum). To secure the supply of future generations of MIPS microprocessors (the 64-bit R4000), SGI acquired the company in 1992 for $333 million and renamed it as MIPS Technologies Inc., a wholly owned subsidiary of SGI.

During SGI's ownership of MIPS, the company introduced the R8000 in 1994 and the R10000 in 1996 and a follow up the R12000 in 1997. During this time, two future microprocessors code-named The Beast and Capitan were in development; these were cancelled after SGI decided to migrate to the Itanium architecture in 1998. As a result, MIPS was spun out as an intellectual property licensing company, offering licences to the MIPS architecture as well as microprocessor core designs.

In 1999, SGI announced it would overhaul its operations; it planned to continue introducing new MIPS processors until 2002, but its server business would include Intel's processor architectures as well. SGI spun MIPS out completely on June 20, 2000 by distributing all its interest as stock dividend to the stockholders.

In early 2008 MIPS laid off 28 employees from its processor business group. On August 13, 2008, MIPS announced a loss of $108.5 million for their fiscal fourth-quarter and that they would lay off another 15% of their workforce. At the time MIPS had 512 employees. In May 2018, according to the company's presence on LinkedIn, there may be less than 50 employees.

Some notable people who worked in MIPS: James Billmaier, Steve Blank, Joseph DiNucci, John L. Hennessy, David Hitz, Earl Killian, Dan Levin, John Mashey, John P. McCaskey, Bob Miller, Stratton Sclavos. and Skip Stritter.

In 2010, Sandeep Vij was named CEO of MIPS Technologies. Vij studied under John Hennessy as a Stanford University graduate student. Prior to taking over at MIPS, Vij was an executive at Cavium Networks, Xilinx and Altera.

EE Times reported that MIPS had 150 employees as of November 1, 2010. If the August 14, 2008 EDN article was accurate about MIPS having over 500 employees at the time, then MIPS reduced their total workforce by 70% between 2008 and 2010.

In addition to its main R&D center in Sunnyvale, California, MIPS has engineering facilities in Shanghai, China, Beaverton, Oregon, Bristol and Kings Langley, both in England. It also has offices in Hsin-chu, Taiwan; Tokyo, Japan; Remscheid, Germany and Haifa, Israel.

During the first quarter of 2013, 498 out of 580 of MIPS patents were sold to Bridge Crossing which was created by Allied Security Trust, with all processor-specific patents and the other parts of the company sold to Imagination Technologies. Imagination had outbid Ceva Inc to buy MIPS with an offer of $100 million, and was investing to develop the architecture for the embedded processor market.

In 2017, under financial pressure itself, Imagination Technologies sold the MIPS processor business to a California-based investment company, Tallwood Venture Capital. Tallwood in turn sold the business to Wave Computing in 2018, both of these companies reportedly having their origins with, or ownership links to, a co-founder of Chips and Technologies and S3 Graphics. Despite the regulatory obstacles that had forced Imagination to divest itself of the MIPS business prior to its own acquisition by Canyon Bridge, bankruptcy proceedings for Wave Computing indicated that the company had in 2018 and 2019 transferred full licensing rights for the MIPS architecture for China, Hong Kong and Macau to CIP United, a Shanghai-based company.

Company timeline

Products

MIPS Technologies created the processor architecture that is licensed to chip makers. Before the acquisition, the company had 125+ licensees who ship more than 500 million MIPS-based processors each year.

MIPS processor architectures and cores are used in home entertainment, networking and communications products. The company licensed its 32- and 64-bit architectures as well as 32-bit cores.

The MIPS32 architecture is a high-performance 32-bit instruction set architecture (ISA) that is used in applications such as 32-bit microcontrollers, home entertainment, home networking devices and mobile designs. MIPS customers license the architecture to develop their own processors or license off-the-shelf cores from MIPS that are based on the architecture.

The MIPS64 architecture is a high performance 64-bit instruction set architecture that is widely used in networking infrastructure equipment through MIPS licensees such as Cavium Networks and Broadcom.

SmartCE (Connected Entertainment) is a reference platform that integrates Android, Adobe Flash platform for TV, Skype, the Home Jinni ConnecTV application and other applications. SmartCE lets OEM customers create integrated products more quickly.

MIPS processor core families

The MIPS processor cores are divided by Imagination into three major families:
 Warrior: hardware virtualization, hardware multi-threading, and SIMD
 M-class: M5100 and M5150, M6200 and M6250
 I-class: I6400, I7200
 P-class: P5600, P6600
 Aptiv: microAptiv (compact, real-time embedded processor core), interAptiv (multiprocessor, multi-threaded core with a nine-stage pipeline), proAptiv (super-scalar, deeply out-of-order processor core with high CoreMark/MHz score)
 Classic. 4K, M14K, 24K, 34K, 74K, 1004K (multicore and multithreaded) and 1074K (superscalar and multithreaded) families.

Licensees
MIPS Technologies had a strong customer licensee base in home electronics and portable media players; for example, 75 percent of Blu-ray Disc players were running on MIPS Technologies processors. In the digital home, the company's processors were predominantly found in digital TVs and set-top boxes. The Sony PlayStation Portable used two processors based on the MIPS32 4K processor.

Within the networking segment, licensees include Cavium Networks and Broadcom. Cavium has used up to 48 MIPS cores for its OCTEON family network reference designs. Broadcom ships Linux-ready MIPS64-based XLP, XLR, and XLS multicore, multithreaded processors. Licensees using MIPS to build smartphones and tablets include Actions Semiconductor and Ingenic Semiconductor. Tablets based on MIPS include the Cruz tablets from Velocity Micro. TCL Corporation is using MIPS processors for the development of smartphones.

Companies can also obtain an MIPS architectural licence for designing their own CPU cores using the MIPS architecture. Distinct MIPS architecture implementations by licensees include Broadcom's BRCM 5000.

Other licensees include Broadcom, which has developed MIPS-based CPUs for over a decade, Microchip Technology, which leverages MIPS processors for its 32-bit PIC32 microcontrollers, Qualcomm Atheros, MediaTek and Mobileye, whose EyeQ chips are based on cores licensed from MIPS.

Operating systems
MIPS is widely supported by Unix-like systems, including Linux, FreeBSD, NetBSD, and OpenBSD.

Google's processor-agnostic Android operating system is built on the Linux kernel. MIPS originally ported Android to its architecture for embedded products beyond the mobile handset, where it was originally targeted by Google but MIPS support was dropped in 2018. In 2010, MIPS and its licensee Sigma Designs announced the world's first Android set-top boxes. By porting to Android, MIPS processors power smartphones and tablets running on the Android operating system.

OpenWrt is an embedded operating system based on the Linux kernel.
While it currently runs on a variety of processor architectures,
it was originally developed for the Linksys WRT54G, which used a 32-bit MIPS processor from Broadcom.
The OpenWrt Table of Hardware now includes MIPS-based devices from Atheros, Broadcom, Cavium, Lantiq, MediaTek, etc.

Real-time operating systems that run on MIPS include CMX Systems, eCosCentric's eCos, ENEA OSE, Express Logic's ThreadX, FreeRTOS, Green Hills Software's Integrity, LynuxWorks' LynxOS, Mentor Graphics, Micrium's Micro-Controller Operating Systems (µC/OS), QNX Software Systems' QNX, Quadros Systems Inc.'s RTXC Quadros RTOS, Segger's embOS and Wind River's VxWorks.

See also
Prpl Foundation

References

Further reading

 
1984 establishments in California
American companies established in 1984
Companies based in San Jose, California
Computer companies established in 1984
Electronics companies established in 1984
Manufacturing companies based in the San Francisco Bay Area
Semiconductor companies of the United States
Technology companies based in the San Francisco Bay Area
1980s initial public offerings
1998 initial public offerings
1992 mergers and acquisitions
2013 mergers and acquisitions
2017 mergers and acquisitions
2018 mergers and acquisitions
Private equity portfolio companies
Computer companies of the United States